Salinas River may refer to:

 Salinas River (California), US
 Salinas River National Wildlife Refuge
 Salinas River State Beach
 Salinas River (Guam)
 Salinas River (Guatemala)
 Salinas River (Mexico)
 Salinas River (Minas Gerais), Brazil